A peripheral DMA controller (PDC) is a feature found in modern microcontrollers. This is typically a FIFO with automated control features for driving implicitly included modules in a microcontroller such as UARTs.

This takes a large burden from the operating system and reduces the number of interrupts required to service and control these type of functions.

See also
 Direct memory access (DMA)
 Autonomous peripheral operation

References

Integrated circuits